Tucker is an American sitcom created by Ron Milbauer and Terri Hughes, that aired on NBC from October 2, 2000 to April 2, 2001. Eight episodes were broadcast in pairs during rerun season in March 2001.

Premise
Tucker's parents have divorced, and so he is forced to move into his despised aunt Claire's house, with her decidedly calmer airplane pilot husband Jimmy and strange cousin Leon. Originally disappointed at the arrangement, he spots their gorgeous neighbour McKenna. From that point forward, he valiantly attempts to become her boyfriend, competing with Seth Green.

The series revolves around divorce, teenage culture and teenage love.

In the UK and Ireland the show aired on Nickelodeon.

Cast

Eli Marienthal as Tucker Pierce
Noelle Beck as Jeannie Pierce
Katey Sagal as Claire Wennick
Nathan Lawrence as Leon Wennick
Alison Lohman as McKenna Reid
Casey Sander as "Captain" Jimmy Wennick
Andrew Lawrence as Kenickie Behar

Episodes

References

External links
 
 

2000s American single-camera sitcoms
2000s American teen sitcoms
2000 American television series debuts
2000 American television series endings
English-language television shows
NBC original programming
Television series about teenagers
Television series by Universal Television
Television series by 20th Century Fox Television